Mark Anders Lepik (born 10 September 2000) is an Estonian footballer who plays as a forward for Kuressaare on loan from Flora, and the Estonia national team.

Club career
For the 2023 season, he went on loan to Kuressaare.

International career
Lepik made his international debut for Estonia on 7 October 2020 in a friendly match against Lithuania.

Career statistics

International

References

External links
 
 
 
 

2000 births
Living people
Footballers from Tallinn
Estonian footballers
Estonia youth international footballers
Estonia international footballers
Estonian expatriate footballers
Estonian expatriate sportspeople in Switzerland
Expatriate footballers in Switzerland
Association football forwards
FC Nõmme United players
FC Flora players
FC Winterthur players
Meistriliiga players
Esiliiga players